Sylvia Michel may refer to:
 Sylvia Michel (footballer)  (born 1972),  German footballer
 Sylvia Michel (minister) (born 1935),  Swiss Reformed Church minister

See also
 Sylvia Mitchell (born 1937), Australian long jumper